Kate Eva Westlake (after marriage, Yeigh; pen name, Aunt Polly Wolly; 1856 – 4 March 1906) was a Canadian writer and an early editor.

Life
Westlake was born in Ingersoll, Ontario. The family moved to London, Ontario where her father succeeded in business. One of her first published works was a serial western story titled "Stranger Than Fiction," published magazine. She became a sub-editor of the newly formed St. Thomas Journal, replacing her brother who died in 1881 at the age of 27.

She was given the editorship of the Fireside Weekly, a family story paper published in Toronto. She sometimes signed her work "Aunt Polly Wogg." She was a Baptist and a Liberal. In 1891 a very  successful book, Sitting Bull's White Ward, was published exploiting the death of Sitting Bull the year before. Westlake is believed to be its anonymous author.

In 1892, she married Frank Yeigh, an author.

She wrote for Canadian Magazine. In 1906, she published A Specimen Spinster which was her only book in her name. The book was about the views on life of Aunt Polly Wolly.

Westlake died in London, Ontario in 1906.

References

1856 births
1906 deaths
People from Ingersoll, Ontario
Canadian newspaper editors
20th-century Canadian women writers
20th-century Canadian non-fiction writers
Canadian women non-fiction writers
19th-century women writers
Women newspaper editors
Wikipedia articles incorporating text from A Woman of the Century